Rubrik is a cloud data management and data security company based in Palo Alto, California, United States founded in December 2013.

History
The company was founded in January 2014 by Bipul Sinha, Arvind Jain, Soham Mazumdar, and Arvind Nithrakashyap.

IVP led a US$180 million Series D funding round in May 2017, at a US$1.3 billion valuation, bringing the company to at least US$292 million raised to date.

In early 2018, Rubrik purchased Datos.io, another cloud data management company.

In January 2019 the startup has raised $261 million, which helped it to reach $3.3 billion total valuation. The core investors were Bain Capital Ventures together with Lightspeed Venture Partners, Greylock Partners, Khosla Ventures and IVP.

In December 2020, the company purchased the assets and intellectual property of Igneous, a Seattle-based company that had recently gone through a mass layoff. Until shortly before the acquisition, Igneous was led by co-founder Kiran Bhageshpur.

Products
The company calls itself a “Zero Trust Data Security.” It provides data management services such as the backup and recovery, targeting enterprises that run hybrid cloud environments. Its software can be run on-premises and in the cloud to protect and manage data.

Third-party sources have cited the rise of ransomware and other corporate threats as increasing the total market demand for off-site backup solutions.

Controversies
In March 2018, Dell EMC sued two former employees that currently work for Rubrik, alleging that the employees downloaded Dell EMC trade secrets, solicited former Dell EMC customers, and provided unfair competitive advantages to Rubrik.

Personnel 
 
Founder Bipul Sinha now serves as CEO after stepping down from his role at Lightspeed.  He holds several patents for distributed storage technologies. He has publicly described inviting all 900+ employees to board meetings as an act of “radical transparency.”

Former Microsoft Chairman John W. Thompson is a board member. Brooklyn Nets basketball player Kevin Durant is a notable investor, citing Rubrik as his first technology investment made with the guidance of noted angel investor Ron Conway.

References

External links
rubrik.com

Companies established in 2014
Companies based in Silicon Valley